Turkoman people may refer to:
 Turkmens
 Iraqi Turkmen
 Syrian Turkomans
 Oghuz Turks, Muslim nomadic group widely referred to as "Turkomens" in 10th–18th century sources

See also
 Turkmen (disambiguation)